Sigurlaug Gísladóttir (born 16 October 1984) is a singer and songwriter. She grew up in Copenhagen and later moved to Iceland and got a B.A. in visual arts.

She performs under the stage name Mr. Silla. Sigurlaug teamed up with Magnús B. Skarphéðinsson to form the duo Mr. Silla & Mongoose. Together, they have performed at Iceland Airwaves two times and have released an album called Foxbite.

Sigurlaug has also been a member of the band Múm and performed together with Snorri Helgason, Low Roar, and Mice Parade.

References

1984 births
Living people
Icelandic women singer-songwriters
Icelandic women in electronic music
Place of birth missing (living people)
21st-century Icelandic women singers